The Mr. Texas Football Award is an honor given to the top high school football player in the state of Texas, United States. It is awarded by Dave Campbell's Texas Football magazine.  The award was established in 2007.

Award winners

References

American football in Texas
Mr. Football awards
2007 establishments in Texas